Christopher Edwards (born 1954) is an American author. He wrote Crazy for God: The Nightmare of Cult Life, a memoir of his seven-month experience as a member of the Unification Church of the United States, in 1976. In an interview while promoting his book, he said he travelled with a bodyguard and was afraid for his life.

Education
Edwards graduated from Yale University with majors in psychology and philosophy.

See also
 Crazy for God

Footnotes

American male non-fiction writers
1954 births
Yale College alumni
Living people
American memoirists